This is a list of current and former Roman Catholic churches in the Roman Catholic Diocese of Brooklyn. The diocese covers the New York City boroughs of Brooklyn and Queens.

The diocesan cathedral is the Cathedral Basilica of St. James in Downtown Brooklyn and its co-cathedral is the Co-Cathedral of St. Joseph in Prospect Heights.

Brooklyn

Queens

Former churches

References

 
Brooklyn